Steve Yates (born 8 December 1953) is an English former professional footballer who played as a left back. He made nearly 300 appearances in the Football League mainly for Southend United.

Career
Born in Measham, Yates began his career at Leicester City, making his Football League debut on 23 March 1974. He later played for Southend United, Doncaster Rovers, Darlington, Chesterfield and Stockport County, before playing non-league football with Shepshed Charterhouse.

References

1953 births
Living people
English footballers
Leicester City F.C. players
Southend United F.C. players
Doncaster Rovers F.C. players
Darlington F.C. players
Chesterfield F.C. players
Stockport County F.C. players
English Football League players
Shepshed Dynamo F.C. players
Association football defenders